Andrea Chiesa (born 6 May 1964) is a former Formula One driver from Switzerland. He participated in 10 Grands Prix, debuting on 1 March 1992.

Career

Chiesa began racing in 1980 with karts, and continued to cars in 1985, competing in Italian Formula 3 and Formula 3000. In 1992, he progressed to Formula One and raced with the Fondmetal team. However, he qualified for only three grands prix out of ten, and scored no championship points after retiring from each race. After the German GP, the team replaced him with Eric van de Poele. After Formula One, Chiesa returned to kart racing and touring cars for several years.

He currently drives GT cars. In 2007, he raced for Speedy Racing in a Spyker C8 GT2 car in LeMans Series. In April 2009, racing squad Swiss Team announced they would be fielding a Maserati Quattroporte in the Italian Superstars touring car series with Chiesa as a driver.

Racing record

Complete International Formula 3000 results
(key) (Races in bold indicate pole position) (Races
in italics indicate fastest lap)

Complete Formula One results
(key)

American Open Wheel
(key)

CART

24 Hours of Le Mans results

References

External links

Profile on F1 Rejects

1964 births
Living people
Swiss racing drivers
Swiss Formula One drivers
Fondmetal Formula One drivers
International Formula 3000 drivers
Champ Car drivers
24 Hours of Le Mans drivers
European Le Mans Series drivers
Superstars Series drivers
Italian emigrants to Switzerland
Swiss people of Italian descent
People of Lombard descent
ADAC GT Masters drivers
24 Hours of Spa drivers

Rebellion Racing drivers
Paul Stewart Racing drivers
EuroInternational drivers